Miguel Ángel Oviedo (born 12 October 1950 in Córdoba) is an Argentine former football midfielder who was part of the Argentina squad that won the 1978 FIFA World Cup.

Oviedo played his entire club career in the Argentine league system, starting with Instituto de Córdoba in 1973.

In 1974, he was signed by Instituto's fierce local rivals Talleres de Córdoba. Over the next eight years Talleres were one of the strongest teams in Argentina, they reached several Semi-Finals in the Nacional championships and lost the final in 1977 on the away goals rule to Club Atlético Independiente.

In 1983 Oviedo joined Independiente, helping the team to win the Metropolitano 1983 championship in his first season with the club and the Copa Libertadores in his second season.

In 1986 Oviedo returned to Talleres but after one season in Córdoba he moved back to Buenos Aires to play for Deportivo Armenio he stayed with the club between 1987 and 1992 despite their relegation from the Primera in 1989.

Oviedo played for Club Atlético Los Andes of the Argentine 3rd division between 1992 and his retirement in 1993.

Honours

Club
 Independiente
Primera Division Argentina: Metropolitano 1983
Copa Libertadores: 1984

International
 Argentina
FIFA World Cup: 1978

References

External links

Argentine footballers
Association football midfielders
Argentine Primera División players
Instituto footballers
Talleres de Córdoba footballers
Club Atlético Independiente footballers
Club Atlético Los Andes footballers
1978 FIFA World Cup players
FIFA World Cup-winning players
Footballers from Córdoba, Argentina
1950 births
Living people
Argentina international footballers